Axel Lindahl (8 December 1885 – 8 August 1959) was a Swedish athlete. He competed in the men's individual cross country event at the 1912 Summer Olympics.

References

External links

1885 births
1959 deaths
Athletes (track and field) at the 1912 Summer Olympics
Swedish male long-distance runners
Olympic athletes of Sweden
Athletes from Stockholm
Olympic cross country runners